Frank Schaffer Besson Jr., CBE (May 30, 1910 – July 15, 1985) was a United States Army general.

Early life
Besson born on May 30, 1910 in Detroit, Michigan.  His father was a West Point graduate and a colonel in the Corps of Engineers.

Military career
Besson graduated seventh in his class from the United States Military Academy in 1932 and was commissioned in the Corps of Engineers. In 1935, he received an M.S. degree in civil engineering from the Massachusetts Institute of Technology. His research project was a collaboration with Rush B. Lincoln Jr. and two other West Point classmates under the supervision of Glennon Gilboy. His early career was noted for the role he played in the development of portable military pipelines, steel landing mats for airplanes, and steel treadway bridges. He is credited with the studies leading to the army's adoption of the Bailey bridge, used extensively in all theaters in World War II.

Besson became Assistant Director of the Third Military Railway Service (with rank of lieutenant colonel) in 1943, and was promoted to Director (with rank of colonel) the following year. As Director of the Third Military Railway Service in Iran from 1944 to 1945, Besson ensured the flow of war materials to the Russian forces through the Persian Corridor. He was promoted to brigadier general, becoming, at just 34, the youngest general officer in the Army Ground Forces and Chief of the Railway Division. Toward the end of World War II, he was Deputy Chief Transportation Officer of the Army Forces in the Western Pacific and, when Japan's collapse was imminent, assumed full control of railroads in Japan. During the first year of occupation, Besson directed the rehabilitation of the Japanese rail system, moving more than 200,000 troops and 150,000 tons of supplies in the first two months.

Subsequent assignments included a tour as Assistant Chief of Staff, Supreme Headquarters Allied Powers Europe (SHAPE), where Besson formulated logistics plans and overall programs to meet the complex requirements of the fifteen nations of the NATO alliance. His efforts in instituting a system for "costing out" five-year programs, thereby bringing force goals into consonance with available resources, earned him the first Army Distinguished Service Medal to be awarded at SHAPE headquarters. He was formally transferred to the Army Transportation Corps on July 28, 1950.

Besson introduced the roll-on/roll-off technique for the rapid loading and discharge of wheeled and tracked vehicles. He further refined these concepts upon assuming command of the Transportation Center and School at Fort Eustis, Virginia in 1953. Besson was the Chief of Transportation, United States Army from March 1958 until April 2, 1962, when he took charge of the United States Army Materiel Command.

Besson was the first Commander of the Army Materiel Command, formed in 1962 during a major army reorganization. During his command, the mammoth logistical organization, with an annual budget exceeding $14 billion and an inventory of $21 billion, employed more than 160,000 civilian personnel, in addition to its military complement of 14,000. In November 1962, Besson assigned Col. John F. Sullivan as project officer for Operation Flat Top, a program that involved conversion of a former seaplane tender, the USS Albemarle (AV 5), into a floating helicopter repair shop for use off the coast of Vietnam.

In 1965, Besson permitted Malcom McLean of SeaLand to develop a plan to improve U.S. military logistics in Vietnam. McLean would go on to recommend containerization as a solution to logistical problems faced by the U.S. military. In 1966, Besson asked the Military Sea Transportation Service to contract SeaLand to operate regular container ship routes between Oakland, California and Okinawa, Japan.

As the first AMC Commander, Besson was charged with consolidating six army technical service organizations into a single command without disrupting effective materiel support for the army. His success resulted in his receiving the Merit Award of the Armed Forces Management Association in 1963. On May 27, 1964, Besson became a full general. He was the first army officer to achieve that rank as head of a logistical organization in peacetime.

In March 1969, Besson was appointed by Robert McNamara to be chairman of the Joint Logistics Review Board, formed to review logistic activities in support of the Vietnam War. In this role, Besson pushed for the centralization of logistical operations, the widespread use of intermodal containers, and the phasing out of Conex boxes.

Besson, who left the review board in 1970, wrote about transportation and related problems in numerous professional journals. While in retirement, Besson was nominated by Richard Nixon as one of the founding directors of the National Rail Passenger Corporation, which ran Amtrak. On July 15, 1985, Besson died of cancer at Walter Reed Army Medical Center.

Besson's awards and decorations include the Army Distinguished Service Medal with two Oak Leaf Clusters, the Legion of Merit with one Oak Leaf Cluster, the Iranian Order of Homayoun, Honorary Commander of the Order of the British Empire, and the Republic of Korea's Order of Military Merit, Second Class (Ulchi).

Personal life
Besson married Nancy Sessions Morris in 1935. They had three sons. After her death in 1974, he married Beatrice Veronica (O'Boyle) George, who had four children from her first marriage. His second wife died of a cerebral hemorrhage in 1978.

In 1980, Besson married Frances Rogers “Betty” (Howell) Wheeler, the widow of General Earle G. Wheeler. After his death, Besson was buried beside his parents and his first two wives at the West Point Cemetery on July 19, 1985.

See also

 General Frank S. Besson, Jr. class Logistics Support Vessel

References

External links
Generals of World War II

1910 births
1985 deaths
United States Military Academy alumni
Military personnel from Detroit
United States Army Corps of Engineers personnel
MIT School of Engineering alumni
United States Army generals of World War II
Recipients of the Legion of Merit
United States Army generals
Recipients of the Distinguished Service Medal (US Army)
Honorary Commanders of the Order of the British Empire
Recipients of the Order of Military Merit (Korea)
Deaths from cancer in Washington, D.C.
Burials at West Point Cemetery